Fast Company is a 1979 Canadian action film directed by David Cronenberg and starring William Smith, John Saxon, Claudia Jennings and Nicholas Campbell. It was written by Phil Savath, Courtney Smith, Alan Treen and Cronenberg. It was primarily filmed at Edmonton International Speedway, in addition to other locations in Edmonton, Alberta, and Western Canada.

Plot
At a racetrack, aging drag racing star Lonnie "Lucky Man" Johnson makes engine refinements to his car, which is sponsored by the international oil company Fast Company (FastCo). On its first test run it blows up, but Lonnie escapes unhurt. FastCo team boss Phil Adamson is not impressed, telling the head mechanic, Elder, that the team can't afford to win if it breaks the budget. In the "Funny Car class", Lonnie's protégé Billy "The Kid" Brooker gives top dog Gary "The Blacksmith" Black a close run.

At the Big Sky meet, Adamson takes a backhander from the organizer. He says that the fans come to see Lonnie, so while the dragster is being repaired he will replace Billy in the Funny Car. Lonnie doesn't like the idea. Billy likes it less, blaming Lonnie's ego. Lonnie's first ever Funny Car run is against Black, who is angry at the driver switch, especially when he loses the race.

En route to a next race in Spokane, Lonnie calls the dragster mechanic with a few ideas, but is told that Adamson cancelled the repair work. At the meet, Lonnie is less than complimentary on his FastCo TV spot. Adamson is incensed and calls the company to say he's bringing in Gary Black. Candy the FastCo ad girl refuses to have sex with the TV interviewer as damage control, so Adamson fires her. He offers Black the job as FastCo driver.

Candy and Billy have sex inside Lonnie's trailer. Lonnie’s girlfriend Sammy shows up and interrupts them, assuming at first it’s Lonnie in bed. Reunited, Lonnie and Sammy kick out Billy and Candy, and they make love. Lonnie talks about quitting racing. Adamson walks in without knocking, causing Lonnie to punch him to the floor. He says they're finished, but Lonnie assures him the car will race. Outside the trailer, Adamson gives Black and his mechanic Meatball a job.

While on another test run, the Funny Car's engine blows, but Lonnie controls the situation using the cockpit safety gear. Billy angrily accuses Black of sabotage, but Lonnie intervenes on Black's behalf. In the pit, Adamson announces that Black is the new Fast Co driver and the whole team is fired. Lonnie goes for him but is slugged with a tire iron by Meatball.

Billy is despondent, but Lonnie insists they'll still race at Edmonton next weekend and plans to steal the car. Billy and P.J. visit the local motor show and are amazed that Adamson has the car on display. That night, Billy and Candy create a diversion while Lonnie steals the car back. Working overtime, Lonnie, Billy, P.J. get it in shape for the race.

At the Edmonton racetrack, Lonnie's surprise independent entry is announced. Adamson is worried that Black will be beaten, but Meatball says he will win as long as he is in the left lane. Lonnie gives an ecstatic Billy the chance to drive in the race.

At the toss up for the lane choice, Billy wins and chooses left. Adamson ensures a last minute change, much to Billy's annoyance. Meatball pours oil on Billy’s lane. As the race gets underway Billy gets a fast start, but Black tries to run him off the road. Black takes the lead, then cuts into Billy's lane and hits the oil, causing his car to explode in a giant fireball. Billy attacks Meatball at the side of the track and in the struggle, Meatball's overalls catch fire. Billy uses his cockpit extinguisher to save his life.

Adamson panics and flees to his plane. As it taxis down the runway, Lonnie jumps in the Funny Car. He catches up just as the plane takes off, clipping the end off a wing. Adamson fights for control but the plane dives into a parked FastCo oil truck, exploding on impact.

The next morning, the team members discuss the future. Lonnie promises he'll have new funding in place soon, but first he and Sammy are going to share some quality time.

Cast
 William Smith as Lonnie "Lucky Man" Johnson
 Claudia Jennings as Sammy
 John Saxon as Phil Adamson
 Nicholas Campbell as Billy "The Kid" Booker
 Don Francks as Elder
 Cedric Smith as Gary "The Blacksmith" Black
 Judy Foster as Candy
 George Buza as Meatball
 David Petersen as Slezak
 Michael Bell as Chuck Randall

Production
The film is the first of his feature films for which Cronenberg did not originate the screenplay. The production of Fast Company brought Cronenberg into contact with cinematographer Mark Irwin, art director Carol Spier, sound editor Bryan Day, and film editor Ronald Sanders, all of whom became regular crew members on his films. Actor Nicholas Campbell, who plays William Smith's young sidekick, also went on to appear in three more Cronenberg films, The Brood, The Dead Zone, and Naked Lunch.

Although Fast Company - an all-action, non-horror, non-psychological B-movie - remains an anomaly in Cronenberg's filmography, it has never lost its place in the affections of its director, who is an enthusiast of cars and their machinery ("which I get very metaphysical and boring about") and sometime racer.

This was the final film for Claudia Jennings before she was killed in a car accident later that year, seven months after the film's release.

Reception
Fast Company received generally positive reviews. It holds an 88% approval rating on Rotten Tomatoes, with an average rating of 6.6/10.

References

External links
 
 
 

1979 films
1979 action films
Drag racing
1970s English-language films
Films scored by Fred Mollin
Films directed by David Cronenberg
Films shot in Edmonton
Canadian independent films
Canadian auto racing films
Canadian action films
1979 independent films
English-language Canadian films
1970s Canadian films